Chit Ya Par Thaw Nway is a 2019 Burmese drama television series. It is a story of Mandalay University. It aired on MRTV-4, from June 19 to July 16, 2019 on Mondays to Fridays at 19:00 for 20 episodes.

Cast

Main
 Nat Khat as Paing Thu
 Chue Lay as Chit Nway
 Thar Htet Nyan Zaw as D Kyaw Khaung
 Khun Nay Chi Cho as Wut Hmone Thin, girlfriend of D Kyaw Khaung
 Mike Mike as Nga Bat Mway
 Han Na Lar as Bumi Mu Yar, girlfriend of Nga Bat Mway

Supporting
 Aung Paing as Ko Oo
 Wai Yan Kyaw as Pa Lar Tar
 Ju Jue Pan Htwar as Hnin Yu, elder sister of Chit Nway
 Phone Shein Khant as Yar Yar Ma
 Mann Thaw Htet as Phoe Ni
 Ye Aung as father of Chit Nway
 May Thinzar Oo as mother of Paing Thu
 Sharr as younger sister of Paing Thu

References

Burmese television series
MRTV (TV network) original programming